The Impossible Mister Pitt (German: Der unmögliche Herr Pitt) is a 1938 German adventure crime film directed by and starring Harry Piel. It also features Willi Schur, Leopold von Ledebur and Hilde Weissner.  It was shot at the Babelsberg Studios in Berlin and on location off the coast of Split in Croatia. The film's sets were designed by the art directors Otto Erdmann and Hans Sohnle. It was based on the novel of the same title by Georg Mühlen-Schulte who also worked on the screenplay.

Synopsis
Two men, Tom and Tim escape from a Tunisian prison where they had been doing hard labour after being arrested following a brawl and not having correct identity documents. They board a luxury yacht and encounter Lucienne and her father Thomas Cay. Tom impersonates a man called Pitt who is engaged to Lucienne and she, taking a liking to him, plays along. He soon uncovers a plot to sabotage the yacht.

Cast

 Harry Piel as 	Tom
 Willi Schur as 	Tim
 Leopold von Ledebur as 	Thomas Cay
 Hilde Weissner as 	Lucienne, seine Tochter
 Hans Junkermann as 	Lord Bonnycastle
 Julia Serda as Lady Jane
 Hans Stiebner as Anatol Mabub
 Werner Scharf as 	José Galvez
 Hans Hermann Schaufuß as 	René Mouche
 Ursula Grabley as Amélie, seine Tochter
 Leonie Duval as 	Fauchette
 Hans Zesch-Ballot as 	Picard, Polizeiinspektor
 Olaf Bach as 	Nicole, Matrose
 Fritz Klaudius as 	Ponpon, Matrose
 Louis Brody as 	Hannibal, Matrose
 Klaus Pohl as 	Parker, Matrose
 Victor Bell as Schwarzer Kunde beim Barbier
 Charly Berger as 	Funker des Polizeikutters
 Horst Birr as Schiffsjunge
 Peter Busse as 	Italienischer Wirt
 Gerhard Dammann as 	Rechtsanwalt
 Jac Diehl as 	Kellner 
 Max Diekmann as 	Raufender Matrose
 Erich Dunskus as 	Kapitän Hook
 Angelo Ferrari as 	Schnellrichter
 Cläre Gilb as 	Mädchen im Gefängnis
 Fred Goebel as Polizist
 Jochen Hauer as 	Duval, Erster Offizier
 Mohamed Husen as Kameltreiber
 Alfred Karen as Mann beim Notar
 Ernst Albert Schaach as 	Sekretär des Untersuchungsrichters
 Paul Schneider-Duncker as 	Sekretär bei Cay
 Georg H. Schnell as Chiron, Senator
 F.W. Schröder-Schrom as 	Ricaut, Notar
 Hasso Sherief-Osmann as 	Schwarzer Diener des Notars
 Otto Stoeckel as Untersuchungsrichter
 Aruth Wartan as 	Arabi
 Sergei Woischeff as Kapitän des Polizeikutters

References

Bibliography 
 Giesen, Rolf. The Nosferatu Story: The Seminal Horror Film, Its Predecessors and Its Enduring Legacy. McFarland, 2019.
 Goble, Alan. The Complete Index to Literary Sources in Film. Walter de Gruyter, 1999.
 Noack, Frank. Veit Harlan: The Life and Work of a Nazi Filmmaker. University Press of Kentucky, 2016.
 Rentschler, Eric. The Ministry of Illusion: Nazi Cinema and Its Afterlife. Harvard University Press, 1996.

External links 
 

1938 films
Films of Nazi Germany
German adventure films
1930s adventure films
1930s German-language films
Films directed by Harry Piel
Terra Film films
1930s German films
Films based on German novels
Seafaring films
Films shot at Babelsberg Studios
Films shot in Croatia
Films set in Tunisia
Films set in Sicily